Kings Park station may refer to:
 Kings Park station (LIRR)
 King's Park railway station